The Mixed duet technical routine competition at the 2019 World Aquatics Championships was held on 13 and 15 July 2019.

Results
The preliminary round was started on 13 July at 11:00. The final was held on 15 July at 17:00.

Green denotes finalists

References

Mixed duet technical routine
World Aquatics Championships